Tenodesis grasp and release is an orthopedic observation of a passive hand grasp and release mechanism, affected by wrist extension or flexion, respectively.   It is caused by the manner of attachment of the finger tendons to the bones and the passive tension created by two-joint muscles used to produce a functional movement or task (tenodesis).  Moving the wrist in extension or flexion will cause the fingers to curl or grip when the wrist is extended, and to straighten or release when the wrist is flexed.

The tenodesis grip and release mechanism is used in occupational therapy, physical therapy and rehabilitation of fine motor impairment, typically various levels of spinal paralysis, and in kinesiology and sports mechanics that are concerned with efficient grasp and release mechanics.  Wrist extension is noted for bat grip in baseball.   Wrist extension is also noted in the form of grip used in most schools of Japanese swordsmanship or kenjutsu.

References 

Hand
Orthopedics